Doin' the Thang! is the debut album by jazz pianist Ronnie Mathews featuring trumpeter Freddie Hubbard recorded for the Prestige label in 1963.

Reception

Alex Henderson of AllMusic said "the LP's focus is modal post-bop and non-soul-jazz hard bop. But even though the material isn't soul-jazz, Mathews' quintet is certainly soulful... Hubbard, who was only 25 when Doin' the Thang was recorded, brings a lot to the session – not only fire, guts, and passion, but also a big, highly appealing tone".

Track listing
All compositions by Ronnie Mathews except where noted
 "The Thang" – 8:02  
 "Ichi Ban" – 3:37  
 "The Orient" – 5:55  
 "Let's Get Down" – 5:14  
 "Prelude to a Kiss" (Duke Ellington, Irving Gordon, Irving Mills) – 5:32  
 "1239-A" (Charles Davis) – 5:57

Personnel
Ronnie Mathews – piano
Freddie Hubbard – trumpet
Charles Davis – baritone saxophone
Eddie Khan – bass
Albert Heath – drums

Production
 Ozzie Cadena – producer
 Rudy Van Gelder – engineer

References

Ronnie Mathews albums
Freddie Hubbard albums
1964 albums
Prestige Records albums
Albums produced by Ozzie Cadena
Albums recorded at Van Gelder Studio